Georgia football team can refer to:
Georgia national football team, the men's association football (soccer) team of the nation of Georgia
Georgia women's national football team, the women's association football (soccer) team of the nation of Georgia
Georgia Bulldogs football, the American football team of the University of Georgia